Girijananda Chowdhury Institute of Management and Technology (GIMT) is an institute offering degree level technical courses in the State of Assam in the non-government sector established by Shrimanta Shankar Academy (SSA) Society. The college was established with permission from the state government and approval from the All India Council for Technical Education (AICTE), and is affiliated to Assam Science and Technology University.

Affiliation
It is affiliated to Assam Science and Technology University. All the undergraduate Bachelor of Engineering courses as well as Master of Business Administration and Master of Computer Application programmes are recognized by the AICTE.

Campus and geography
GIMT is located at Hathkhowapara, Azara, Guwahati, near  the National Highway 37, 7 km to the east of Lokpriya Gopinath Bordoloi International Airport and 20 km to the west of Guwahati Railway Station and 4 km to the north of Azara Railway Station.

Hostels
The Institute has Boys' as well as Girls' Hostel inside its premises. All the rooms of the hostels (both Boys' and Girls') are of twin sharing basis and fully secured with 24/7 security personnel.

Academics
The GIMT undergraduate program is for Bachelor of Technology. The institute also offers Bachelor of Computer Application(BCA), Bachelor of Science (B.Sc) and Bachelor of Business Administration (BBA) in the respective Departments. It offers postgraduate level programs like Master of Technology, Master of Business Administration and Master of Computer Application. Also PhD programs are offered in some branches of Engineering and in Business Administration.

Departments and cells

Departments
To deal with the laboratory and practical components of the syllabi, the institute has 23 departmental laboratories.

Undergraduate departments
Department of Civil Engineering
Department of Computer Science and Engineering
Department of Electronics and Telecommunication Engineering
Department of Mechanical Engineering
Department of Electrical Engineering
Department of Physics
Department of Mathematics
Department of Chemistry

Postgraduate departments
Department of Business Administration
Department of Computer Application
Department of Computer Science and Engineering
Department of Electronics and Communication Engineering
Department of Instrumentation and Control Engineering
Department of Mechanical Engineering

Supporting department
Department of Humanities and Social Science

Extracurricular

There is a well equipped Gym, sports common rooms, an ATM, a hygienic canteen are inside the campus of the institute.

Sports week
As part of extracurricular activities, a sports week is organised in January. Competitions in cricket, football, volleyball, badminton, table tennis, carrom, chess, cyber games, etc. are organised.

Annual festival
Every year the students and administration of GIMT organize a festival cum competition called Euphuism, usually in the last week of January. Sports and cultural events are held during the festival.

The featured cultural events of the festival include the "DJ Nite" and the "Prime Nite" where artists and bands perform to huge audiences. The other events include:

Technical events
Archytas - the tech war
Cryptex - the Babbage's follower
Cyber Mania - the cyber battleground
Circuitronics - to design a circuit according to a problem statement

Non-technical events
Click - frame the world, the photography competition
Photokraft - Photoshop competition
Mobile Camera Phone Photography Contest (only for GIMTians)
Quizzard - the generic quiz
Clash - the knock down debating competition
Incense - floral designing
Splash in - design your fabric
Glitters - Mr. & Miss GIMT personality contest

Games
Games such as Eating Competition, Rangoli Making Competition, Antakshari, Blind Date, Tug of War, Balancing Competition etc. are organized.

Yuva-redefining dreams
GIMT launched a youth awareness campaign during the annual fest EUPHUISM 2010, called Yuva - Redefining Dreams, with the tagline "All we need is Youth and a Dream..." Latest event being held: GIMT Euphuism'14.

Uttaran
GIMT published the first edition of its wall magazine Uttaran in mid-2009. The first edition was bilingual in Assamese and English. From the second edition it was published separately in Assamese and English.

Annual magazine
GIMTech

Sister institutes
Girijananda Chowdhury Institute of Management and Technology, Tezpur - A project of Shrimanta Shankar Academy (SSA) and Government of Assam, under Public-Private Partnership (PPP) Mode. GIMT-Tezpur is the first institution established under Public-Private Partnership (PPP) mode in north eastern region of India.
Girijananda Chowdhury Institute of Pharmaceutical Science (GIPS) - the first self-financing private Pharmacy Institute in north eastern region offering Bachelor of Pharmacy
Shrimanta Shankar Academy, Panbazar - affiliated to Assam Higher Secondary Education Council (AHSEC)
Shrimanta Shankar Academy, Dispur - affiliated to Central Board of Secondary Education (CBSE). It also include  junior college(XI-XII). To know more about SSA ->

References

External links
Official website
AdmissionFever.com

Engineering colleges in Assam
All India Council for Technical Education
Business schools in Assam
Universities and colleges in Guwahati
Colleges affiliated to Gauhati University
Educational institutions established in 2006
2006 establishments in Assam